The MTV Video Music Awards Japan 2006 were hosted by Mokomichi Hayami and Masami Hisamoto at Tokyo. The 5th annual show premiered live on MTV, Saturday May 27 at Yoyogi National Gymnasium. The awards show was filmed before a live audience of 8000. The event featured live performances from the far east and the west, including Japanese acts AI, Def Tech, Kumi Koda and Remioromen, along with international acts Hoobastank, John Legend, Kelly Rowland, Rihanna and Se7en from South Korea. The event also featured a special performance by Japanese R&B superstar Ken Hirai joining forces with John Legend. The award ceremony was also marked by appearance of the "King of Pop", Michael Jackson.

Awards
Winners are in bold text.

Video of the Year
Kumi Koda — "Butterfly"
 Gorillaz — "Feel Good Inc."
 Ketsumeishi — "Sakura"
 Madonna — "Hung Up"
 Oasis — "Lyla"

Album of the Year
Orange Range — Natural
 The Black Eyed Peas — Monkey Business
 Ketsumeishi — Ketsunopolis 4
 Mr. Children — I Love You
 Oasis — Don't Believe The Truth

Best Male Video
Ken Hirai — "Pop Star"
 50 Cent featuring Olivia — "Candy Shop"
 Hyde — "Countdown"
 Jack Johnson — "Sitting, Waiting, Wishing"
 Kanye West — "Diamonds From Sierra Leone"

Best Female Video
Kumi Koda — "Butterfly"
 Namie Amuro — "Wowa"
 Mariah Carey — "We Belong Together"
 Madonna — "Hung Up"
 Nana starring Mika Nakashima — "Glamorous Sky"

Best Group Video
Def Tech — "Konomama"
 The Black Eyed Peas — "Don't Phunk With My Heart"
 Oasis — "Lyla"
 Orange Range — "Kizuna"
 Tokyo Incidents — "Shuraba"

Best New Artist
Rihanna — "Pon De Replay"
 Ayaka — "I Believe"
 Def Tech — "Konomama"
 High and Mighty Color — "Over"
 Kaiser Chiefs — "I Predict a Riot"

Best Rock Video
Green Day — "Boulevard Of Broken Dreams"
 Asian Kung-Fu Generation — "World Apart"
 Coldplay — "Speed of Sound"
 Ellegarden — "Red Hot"
 Sambomaster — "Sekai wa Sore o Ai to Yobundaze"

Best Pop Video
Remioromen — "Konayuki"
 The Black Eyed Peas — "Don't Phunk With My Heart"
 Ayumi Hamasaki — "Fairyland"
 Kaela Kimura — "Rirura Riruha"
 Gwen Stefani — "Hollaback Girl"

Best R&B Video
AI — "Story"
 Mariah Carey — "We Belong Together"
 Craig David — "All the Way"
 Destiny's Child — "Stand Up for Love"
 Crystal Kay — "Kirakuni"

Best Hip-Hop Video
50 Cent featuring Mobb Deep — "Outta Control"
 Kreva — "Issai Gassai"
 Teriyaki Boyz — "HeartBreaker"
 Kanye West featuring Jamie Foxx — "Gold Digger"
 Zeebra — "Street Dreams"

Best Reggae Video
Shōnan no Kaze — "Karasu"
 Daddy Yankee — "Gasolina"
 Fire Ball — "Kishitohishito"
 Jumbomaatch featuring Takafin, Boxer Kid and Mighty Jam Rock — "Brand New Style Hi-Fi"
 Sean Paul — "We Be Burnin'"

Best Dance Video
Gorillaz — "Feel Good Inc."
 Madonna — "Hung Up"
 M-Flo Loves Emyli and Diggy-Mo — "Dopamine"
 New Order — "Krafty"
 Towa Tei featuring Kylie Minogue — "Sometime Samurai"

Best Video from a Film
Nana starring Mika Nakashima — "Glamorous Sky" (from Nana)
 Amerie — "1 Thing" (from Hitch)
 Toshinobu Kubota — "Kimi No Soba Ni" (from Under The Same Moon)
 Tamio Okuda — "Toritsu Baa" (from Custom Made 10.30)
 Reira starring Yuna Ito — "Endless Story" (from Nana)

Best Collaboration
Tomoyasu Hotei x Rip Slyme — "Battle Funkatic"
 Bow Wow featuring Omarion — "Let Me Hold You"
 Missy Elliott featuring Ciara and Fat Man Scoop — "Lose Control"
 Glay x Exile — "Scream"
 Crystal Kay x Chemistry — "Two As One"

Best buzz ASIA

Japan
Kumi Koda — "Trust You"
 Chemistry — "Almost In Love"
 Yo Hitoto — "Pinwheel"
 L'Arc-en-Ciel — "Jojoushi"
 Mika Nakashima — "Amazing Grace 05"

South Korea
Se7en — "Start Line"
 Buzz — "Coward"
 Clazziquai Project — "Hold Your Tears"
 Joosuc featuring Lim Jung Hee — "Hip Hop Music"
 Tei — "Love is...one"

Taiwan
Jay Chou — "Hair Like Snow"
 Kelly Chan — "Short News"
 F.I.R — "Thousand Years Love"
 Nicholas Tse — "Song Of The Brave"
 Cyndi Wong — "Honey"

Special awards

Best Director
Yasuyuki Yamaguchi

Best Special Effects in a Video
Soul'd Out — "Iruka"

The Most Influential Songwriter Award
John Legend

Inspiration Award
Destiny's Child

Legend Award
Michael Jackson

Live performances
AI
Def Tech
Hoobastank
John Legend featuring Ken Hirai
Kelly Rowland
Kumi Koda
Remioromen
Rihanna
Se7en

Guest celebrities

Andrew W.K.
Anna Tsuchiya
Daichi Miura
High and Mighty Color
Neko Hiroshi
Mori Izumi
JK
Joosuc
K
Kaela Kimura
Megumi
melody.
Mika Nakashima
Miliyah Kato
Yasuda Misako
Morisanchu

Namie Amuro
Nigo
Orange Range
Pamela Anderson
Soul'd Out
Sowelu
SpongeBob SquarePants
Shōnan no Kaze
Takanori Gomi
Tempura Family
Tohoshinki
Trey Songz
Yui
Yuna Ito
Zeebra

2006 in Japanese music